Cape Breton—Canso is a federal electoral district in Nova Scotia, Canada, that has been represented in the House of Commons of Canada since 2004. Its population in 2011 was 75,247. It is the successor to Bras d'Or (later known as Bras d'Or—Cape Breton), which was represented in the House of Commons from 1997 to 2004.

Demographics

From the 2016 census

Languages (mother tongue): 90.8% English, 6.5% French, 1.2% Mi'kmaq, 0.4% German, 0.2% Dutch, 0.1% Mandarin, 0.1% Arabic, 0.1% Scottish Gaelic, 0.1% Tagalog

Average age: 46.4

Average household size: 2.3

Geography
The district includes eastern Guysborough County, and the western, southern and eastern coasts of Cape Breton Island.  Communities include Glace Bay, Louisbourg, Inverness, Chéticamp, St. Peters, Port Hawkesbury, Mulgrave, Guysborough, Dominion and Canso. The area is 9,438 km2.

Political geography
In 2008, the Liberals won most of their support on Cape Breton Island, whereas the mainland portion of the riding voted Conservative with a few Liberal and NDP pockets The Conservatives and the NDP both won a small handful of polls on the island, and the Greens won a poll containing Judique.

History
The riding of Bras d'Or was created in 1996 from parts of Cape Breton Highlands—Canso and Cape Breton—East Richmond ridings.

Bras d'Or was renamed "Bras d'Or—Cape Breton" in 1998. It was abolished in 2003. Most of its territory (except for the community of Sydney River) was incorporated into a new riding called "Cape Breton—Canso", and it also added a portion of Pictou—Antigonish—Guysborough on the mainland.

Under the 2012 federal electoral redistribution, this riding gained 9% of its new territory from Central Nova.

Members of Parliament

Election results

Cape Breton—Canso

2021 general election

2019 general election

2015 general election

2011 general election

2008 general election

2006 general election

2004 general election

Bras d'Or–Cape Breton

2000 general election

Bras d'Or

1997 general election

See also
 List of Canadian federal electoral districts
 Past Canadian electoral districts

References

Notes

External links
Riding history for Bras d'Or (1996–1998) from the Library of Parliament
Riding history for Bras d'Or—Cape Breton (1998–2003) from the Library of Parliament
 Riding history for Cape Breton—Canso (2003– ) from the Library of Parliament

Nova Scotia federal electoral districts
Politics of the Cape Breton Regional Municipality
Guysborough County, Nova Scotia
Inverness County, Nova Scotia
Richmond County, Nova Scotia